California's 64th State Assembly district is one of 80 California State Assembly districts. It is currently represented by Democrat Blanca Pacheco of Downey.

District profile 
The district encompasses parts of South Los Angeles and the South Bay. The district largely runs along the east side of Interstate 110 from South LA down towards the harbor.

Los Angeles County – 4.8%
 Carson
 Compton
 East Rancho Dominguez
 Long Beach – 7.0%
 Los Angeles – 4.9%
 Broadway-Manchester – partial
 Harbor Gateway – partial
 Watts – partial
 Wilmington
 Rancho Dominguez
 West Rancho Dominguez
 Willowbrook

Election results from statewide races

List of Assembly Members 
Due to redistricting, the 64th district has been moved around different parts of the state. The current iteration resulted from the 2011 redistricting by the California Citizens Redistricting Commission.

Election results 1992 - present

2020

2018

2016

2014

2012

2010

2008

2006

2004

2002

2000

1998

1996

1994

1992

See also 
 California State Assembly
 California State Assembly districts
 Districts in California

References

External links 
 District map from the California Citizens Redistricting Commission

64
Government of Los Angeles County, California
Government of Los Angeles
Government in Long Beach, California
Carson, California
Compton, California
Watts, Los Angeles
Willowbrook, California
Wilmington, Los Angeles